General elections were held in Northern Rhodesia on 30 October 1962, with by-elections for several seats held on 10 December. Although the United Federal Party won the most seats in the Legislative Council, and Northern Rhodesian African National Congress leader Harry Nkumbula had made a secret electoral pact with the UFP, Nkumbula decided to form a government with the United National Independence Party.

Electoral system
The elections were carried out under the "15-15-15" system, with 15 seats elected by an upper roll, 15 seats by a lower roll and 15 seats by the national roll; the national roll seats consisted of four 'reserved' two-seat constituencies returning an African and a European member; three two-member 'open' constituencies that would return two members of any race, and one nationwide constituency for Asians. The initial plan for the reserved and open national roll seats was that candidates would have to receive at least 15% of the vote from both the upper and lower rolls to be elected. However, this was fiercely opposed by Prime Minister of the Federation of Rhodesia and Nyasaland Roy Welensky, as the lower roll was likely to be entirely black, giving his UFP little chance of winning seats. The system was later changed to require candidates to receive at least 10% of the vote from each race, and at least 20% of the vote from either the upper or lower roll.

To qualify for the upper roll, voters had to have an income of at least £720 or own at least £1,500 of immovable property. This was reduced to £480/£1,000 for those with a full primary education and £300/£1,000 for those with at least four years of secondary education. Several people were automatically allowed to register as upper roll voters, including chiefs, hereditary councillors, members of native authorities and courts, municipal councils, township housing boards and area housing boards, ministers of religion, members of certain religions with at least two years of secondary education, pensioners, university graduates, holders of an award from the Queen, those with a letter of exemption under the African Exemption Ordinance dated prior to 1 July 1961, or be the wife of a qualified upper roll voter (in polygamous marriages, only the senior wife qualified). Lower roll voters had to have an income of at least £120 or own immovable property worth at least £250. Certain other people were automatically entitled to be a lower roll voter, including tribal councillors, members of native authorities and courts, municipal councils, township housing boards and area housing boards, headmen, pensioners, members of certain religious bodies, holders of an award from the Queen, or people registered as Individual, Peasant or Improved Farmers for two years prior to their application. The wife (or senior wife) of anyone qualifying to be a lower roll voter also qualified. 

The upper roll had a total of 37,142 voters, of which 27,893 were European, 7,321 were African and 1,928 were Asian. The lower roll had 91,941 voters, of which 91,913 were African and 28 Asian.

In order to vote, voters had to dip their thumbs in red ink, which would remain for two days. In Lusaka two European voters refused to dip their thumbs, and were barred from voting. One, Colin Cunningham, a former leader of the Rhodesian Republican Party, claimed it would be "trespass against his person."

Campaign
UNIP originally planned to boycott the elections in protest at the failure to move to majority rule. However, the decision was later reversed after the outcome of the Delimitation Commission.
UNIP leader Kenneth Kaunda spoke at over a hundred meetings during the campaign. In Sweden the Social Democratic Party and the Liberal Party started an appeal for £20,000 to contribute to UNIP's election campaign, calling federal UFP leader Roy Welensky "sabre-rattling" and a "leader of the white Fascists." The campaign raised only £3,700.

Conduct
On 26 October NRANC official Danwell Kuseka was killed when he was ambushed after an election meeting near Kitwe; three others were injured, one with a broken back. Kaunda called for UNIP members to co-operate with the police in finding the attackers. African candidates for the UFP were reported to have experienced a "living hell of intimidation."
Polling day took place largely without incident and saw a high turnout. In the Congolese city of Elisabethville a group of 100 Northern Rhodesians attended the British Consul to vote. However, after they discovered that only 17 of them had registered, they stormed the building and stoned the consul, resulting in him being hospitalised. Congolese police arrested 15 of the group.

Results
On election day, 14 of the upper roll seats and all 15 lower roll seats were decided, but only five of the 15 national seats; the UFP won 15 seats, UNIP 14 and the NRANC five. By-elections were subsequently held on 10 December for the Livingstone upper roll seats, and for the ten remaining national seats, with the UFP winning in Livingstone, and the NRANC winning the only two national roll seats to have a winner, leaving the UFP with a final total of 16 seats and the NRANC with seven.

By constituency

By-elections

Aftermath
With almost all candidates losing their deposits, the three Liberal Party ministers (John Moffat, Harry Franklin and Alfred Gondwe) resigned immediately after the elections. In mid-November the party announced that it was disbanding, with members advised to join or support UNIP instead.

Nkumbula held talks with both Kaunda and Roberts about the formation of a coalition government, saying he would consider a coalition with UNIP "if Kaunda and his henchmen made a statement unreservedly condemning Communism and the use of violence and intimidation.", and a coalition with the UFP if "thy stated that they wanted to see the end of political federation and its replacement with only an economic association". Kaunda subsequently released a statement stating "I believe that both Mr. Nkumbula and myself should forget the bitterness of the past and do what we can to establish majority rule in this country. On 14 December Governor Evelyn Hone announced the formation of a coalition government by UNIP and the NRARNC.

See also
List of members of the Legislative Council of Northern Rhodesia (1962–64)

References

General election
1962
Northern Rhodesian general election
1962
Northern Rhodesian general election
Northern Rhodesian general election